The Vămășoaia is a right tributary of the river Bahlui in eastern Romania. It flows into the Bahlui in Holboca.

References

Rivers of Romania
Rivers of Iași County